Coccoloba uvifera is a species of flowering plant in the buckwheat family, Polygonaceae, that is native to coastal beaches throughout tropical America and the Caribbean, including southern Florida, the Bahamas, the Greater and Lesser Antilles, and Bermuda. Common names include seagrape and baygrape.

Fruit
In late summer, it bears green fruit, about  diameter,  in large, grape-like clusters. The fruit gradually ripens to a purplish color. Each contains a large pit that constitutes most of the volume of the fruit.

Cultivation and propagation
Although it is capable of surviving down to about 2 °C (35.6 °F), the tree cannot survive frost. The leaves turn reddish before withering. The seeds of this plant, once gathered, must be planted immediately, for unlike most plants, the seeds cannot withstand being stored for future planting.

C. uvifera is wind-resistant, moderately tolerant of shade, and highly tolerant of salt, so it is often planted to stabilize beach edges; it is also planted as an ornamental shrub. The fruit is very tasty, and can be used for jam or eaten directly from the tree.

Sea grape is a dioecious species, that is, male and female flowers are borne on separate plants, and cross-pollination is necessary for fruit to develop. Honey bees and other insects help pollinate these plants; male and female plants can be distinguished by the appearance of their flowers, as males usually show dead flower stalks.
Hardiness: USDA zone 9B–11
Propagation: seeds and cuttings
Culture: partial shade/full sun, drought tolerance

Uses
Coccoloba uvifera  is a popular ornamental plant in south Florida yards. It serves as a dune stabilizer and protective habitat for small animals. Tall sea grape plants behind beaches help prevent sea turtles from being distracted by lights from nearby buildings. The sap has been used for dyeing and tanning leather. The wood has occasionally been used in furniture, as firewood, or for making charcoal. The fruits of the sea grape may be eaten raw, cooked into jellies and jams, or fermented into sea grape wine.

Classification
The first botanical names of the plant were assigned in 1696 by Hans Sloane, who called it Prunus maritima racemosa, "maritime grape-cluster Prunus", and Leonard Plukenet, who named it Uvifera littorea, "grape-bearer of the shore", both of which names reflect the European concept of "sea-grape", expressed in a number of languages by the explorers of the times. The natives viewed it as a large mulberry.

The first edition of Linnaeus's Species Plantarum (1753), based on Plukenet, assigned the plant to Polygonum uvifera and noted flores non vidi, "I have not seen the flowers."  Subsequently, Patrick Browne, The Civil and Natural History of Jamaica (1756) devised Coccoloba for it. Relying on Browne, Linnaeus' second edition (1762), changed the classification to Coccolobus uvifera, citing all the other names. Coccoloba comes from the Greek kokkolobis, a kind of grape, literally, "berry pod".

Gallery

References

  Preview available, Google Books.

uvifera
Halophytes
Flora of the Caribbean
Flora of Florida
Flora of Bermuda
Flora of the Bahamas
Trees of Îles des Saintes
Plants described in 1759
Garden plants of North America
Fruit trees
Taxa named by Carl Linnaeus
Dioecious plants